Thomas Owens (10 July 1938 – 28 February 2015) was an Australian sailor who competed in the 1964 Summer Olympics.

References

1938 births
2015 deaths
Olympic sailors of Australia
Australian male sailors (sport)
Sailors at the 1964 Summer Olympics – Star
20th-century Australian people